Two dock landing ships of the United States Navy have been named USS Tortuga, after the Dry Tortugas, islands off Florida.

 The first  was commissioned in 1945, in action during the Korean War and the Vietnam War, and decommissioned in 1970.
 The second  was commissioned in 1990 and is on active service as of 2016.

United States Navy ship names